Hartheim am Rhein  is a town in the Breisgau-Hochschwarzwald district, Baden-Württemberg, Germany with about 5000 inhabitants.

The districts of Hartheim am Rhein are Bremgarten, Feldkirch and Hartheim. For the first time, Hartheim am Rhein ist referred to in the Lorsch Codex in 772.

In 2012, the name of the town was changed from Hartheim to Hartheim am Rhein.

Local council (Gemeinderat)
Elections in May 2014:
 Freie Wähler Württemberg (Free voters):28,8 %=5 seats 
 CDU: 27,6 %=4 seats 
 Für unsere Dörfer (FuD) (For our villages): 22,7 %=4 seats 
 Frauenliste Deutschland-Kommunale Frauenlisten (Women's list):11,9 %=2 seats
 SPD 9,0 %=1 seat

Mayors
 1946–1969: Josef Widmann
 1969–1982: Alfred Vonarb
 1982–2001: Erich Dilger († 29. Juli 2001)
 2002–2009: Martin Singler
 2010–2017: Kathrin Schönberger
 since 2017: Stefan Ostermaier

References

Breisgau-Hochschwarzwald
Baden